Utricularia rhododactylos is an annual carnivorous plant that belongs to the genus Utricularia (family Lentibulariaceae). It is a terrestrial or affixed subaquatic species. It is endemic to the Northern Territory in Australia.

See also 
 List of Utricularia species

References 

Carnivorous plants of Australia
Flora of the Northern Territory
rhododactylos
Lamiales of Australia